İsmail Köse (born 1 January 1996) is a Turkish footballer who plays as a midfielder for İçel İdman Yurdu.

Career
On 17 June 2012, he signed a 3-year contract, becoming a professional football player with his hometown club.

On 23 December 2012, he scored his first professional career goal against Bandırmaspor FC in Spor Toto 2.Lig

On 30 January 2014, he signed a three and half year contract with Manisaspor.

On 15 February 2014, he made his debut game in the TFF 1. League against Karşıyaka SK.

International career
Köse won the Most Valuable Player Award in the Muntenia Trophy Tournament in Romania on 11 August 2012.

On 14 October 2012, Kose scored his debut goal against the Kazakhstan national under-17 football team on his debut game in UEFA in the qualifying round way to 2013 UEFA European Under-17 Football Championship.

Personal life
His father played football in amateur league. His older brother also plays football in Menemen Belediyespor as midfielder.

References

External links
 
 
 İsmail Köse's Facebook page
 

1996 births
Living people
Sportspeople from Manisa
Turkish footballers
Turkey youth international footballers
Association football forwards
Manisaspor footballers
Göztepe S.K. footballers
TFF First League players